Tocumen is a city and corregimiento in Panamá District, Panamá Province, Panama with a population of 74,952 as of 2010. Its population as of 1990 was 47,032; its population as of 2000 was 83,187. It is the site of the Tocumen International Airport.

Climate 
According to the Köppen Climate Classification system, Tocumen has a tropical monsoon climate, abbreviated "Am" on climate maps.

References

Corregimientos of Panamá Province
Populated places in Panamá Province
Panamá District